The Harris County School District is a public school district in Harris County, Georgia, United States, based in Hamilton. It serves the communities of Cataula, Ellerslie, Fortson, Hamilton, Hopewell, Pine Mountain, Shiloh, Waverly Hall, and West Point.

Schools
The Harris County School District has four elementary schools, one intermediate school, one middle school, and one high school.

Elementary schools
 Mulberry Creek Elementary School
 New Mountain Hill Elementary School
 Park Elementary School
 Pine Ridge Elementary School

Middle school
 Creekside Intermediate School (grades 5 and 6)
 Harris County Carver Middle School

High school
 Harris County High School

References

External links
 
 Lucy Laney Elementary School historical marker
 Mountain Hill District Consolidated School historical marker
 Sunnyside School historical marker

School districts in Georgia (U.S. state)
Education in Harris County, Georgia